Prunus perulata is a species of bird cherry native to Sichuan and Yunnan in China, preferring to grow at 2400–3200m. It is a tree typically 6–12m tall. Its flowers are borne on a raceme, quite small, with dull white to creamy-yellow petals. Its closest relative is Prunus buergeriana, from which it is morphologically and genetically distinct.

Ecology
Its fruit are consumed by the endangered Yunnan snub-nosed monkey, Rhinopithecus bieti. It is a forest gap specialist, taking advantage of treefalls to establish at the shadier edges of gaps.

References

perulata
Bird cherries
Endemic flora of China
Flora of South-Central China
Plants described in 1911